Nigel Bevan (born 3 January 1968) is a British athlete. He competed in the men's javelin throw at the 1992 Summer Olympics.

References

External links
 

1968 births
Living people
Athletes (track and field) at the 1992 Summer Olympics
British male javelin throwers
Olympic athletes of Great Britain
Sportspeople from Ipswich